

H 

 
 
 
 
 
 
 
 
 
 
 
 
 
 
 
 
 
 
 
 
 2151 Hadwiger
 
 
 
 
 
 
 
 682 Hagar
 
 
 
 
 1971 Hagihara
 
 
 
 
 368 Haidea
 
 
 
 
 
 
 
 
 
 
 
 1995 Hajek
 
 
 
 
 
 
 
 
 
 
 1098 Hakone
 
 
 
 
 9000 Hal
 5028 Halaesus
 
 518 Halawe
 
 
 
 
 1024 Hale
 
 
 
 
 
 
 
 
 1308 Halleria
 
 
 
 
 
 
 
 
 
 
 
 1460 Haltia
 
 
 
 
 
 
 
 
 
 449 Hamburga
 
 
 452 Hamiltonia
 
 
 
 
 723 Hammonia
 
 
 
 
 
 
 
 
 
 
 
 
 
 
 
 
 
 
 
 
 
 
 
 
 
 
 
 
 
 
 
 
 
 
 
 
 
 
 
 
 
 
 
 
 
 
 
 
 
 
 
 
 
 7816 Hanoi
 
 480 Hansa
 
 
 
 
 
 
 
 
 5475 Hanskennedy
 
 
 1118 Hanskya
 
 
 
 
 
 
 
 
 
 
 
 
 
 
 
 724 Hapag
 
 578 Happelia
 
 
 
 
 
 
 
 
 
 
 
 
 
 
 
 2003 Harding
 
 
 
 1372 Haremari
 
 
 
 
 
 
 
 
 
 
 
 
 40 Harmonia
 
 
 
 
 
 
 
 
 
 
 
 4149 Harrison
 
 
 
 
 
 
 
 
 
 
 
 
 
 
 
 
 
 
 
 
 
 
 
 
 
 736 Harvard
 
 
 
 
 
 10249 Harz
 
 
 
 
 
 
 
 
 
 
 
 
 
 
 
 
 
 
 
 
 
 
 
 
 
 
 2340 Hathor
 
 2436 Hatshepsut
 
 
 
 
 
 
 
 136108 Haumea
 
 
 
 
 
 
 
 
 
 
 362 Havnia
 
 
 
 
 
 1824 Haworth
 
 
 
 
 
 
 
 
 
 
 
 
 
 
 
 
 
 
 
 
 
 
 
 
 
 
 
 
 
 
 
 
 
 
 
 
 
 
 6 Hebe
 
 
 
 
 1650 Heckmann
 
 108 Hecuba
 
 207 Hedda
 
 1251 Hedera
 
 476 Hedwig
 
 
 
 
 
 
 
 
 
 
 325 Heidelberga
 
 
 10252 Heidigraf
 
 
 
 1732 Heike
 
 
 
 
 
 
 
 2016 Heinemann
 
 
 
 
 
 
 
 
 
 
 
 
 
 100 Hekate
 
 
 
 624 Hektor
 949 Hel
 699 Hela
 
 
 101 Helena
 
 
 
 
 
 
 
 
 
 
 
 1845 Helewalda
 
 
 522 Helga
 
 
 
 30942 Helicaon
 1075 Helina
 895 Helio
 967 Helionape
 1370 Hella
 
 
 
 
 
 11573 Helmholtz
 
 
 
 
 113390 Helvetia
 
 801 Helwerthia
 
 
 
 
 
 
 
 
 
 2085 Henan
 
 2005 Hencke
 
 
 
 
 
 
 
 
 
 
 
 
 
 
 
 
 225 Henrietta
 
 826 Henrika
 
 1516 Henry
 
 
 
 
 
 
 
 
 
 
 1365 Henyey
 
 
 2212 Hephaistos
 
 103 Hera
 5143 Heracles
 
 
 880 Herba
 
 
 
 
 
 9931 Herbhauptman
 
 
 
 532 Herculina
 458 Hercynia
 
 
 
 
 
 1652 Hergé
 3099 Hergenrother
 1751 Herget
 
 
 
 923 Herluga
 
 
 
 
 
 
 
 
 
 346 Hermentaria
 69230 Hermes
 685 Hermia
 
 121 Hermione
 
 
 
 
 
 
 546 Herodias
 
 
 
 
 
 
 
 2000 Herschel
 
 206 Hersilia
 
 135 Hertha
 
 1693 Hertzsprung
 
 
 
 1952 Hesburgh
 
 69 Hesperia
 
 
 
 46 Hestia
 
 
 
 
 
 
 
 
 
 
 
 
 
 
 
 
 
 
 
 
 
 
 
 
 
 
 944 Hidalgo
 
 
 
 
 
 
 
 
 
 
 
 
 
 
 
 
 
 
 7119 Hiera
 
 
 
 
 
 
 
 
 
 
 
 
 
 
 
 
 
 
 
 996 Hilaritas
 
 
 153 Hilda
 
 684 Hildburg
 
 898 Hildegard
 
 928 Hildrun
 
 
 
 
 
 6395 Hilliard
 
 
 
 
 
 
 1897 Hind
 
 
 
 
 
 
 4000 Hipparchus
 17492 Hippasos
 426 Hippo
 
 
 692 Hippodamia
 
 
 
 
 
 
 
 
 
 
 
 
 
 
 
 
 1999 Hirayama
 
 
 
 
 
 
 
 
 
 
 
 6709 Hiromiyuki
 
 
 
 
 
 
 
 
 
 
 
 
 
 
 
 
 
 706 Hirundo
 
 
 
 
 
 
 
 804 Hispania
 
 
 
 
 
 
 
 
 
 
 
 
 
 
 
 
 
 
 
 
 
 
 
 3225 Hoag
 
 
 
 
 
 
 
 
 
 
 
 
 
 
 
 
 
 
 
 1726 Hoffmeister
 
 
 
 
 
 
 
 
 788 Hohensteina
 
 
 
 
 
 
 
 
 
 
 
 
 
 
 
 
 
 872 Holda
 
 
 
 
 
 
 
 
 1132 Hollandia
 
 
 
 
 
 
 
 
 
 
 
 
 
 
 5477 Holmes
 
 
 378 Holmia
 
 
 
 4435 Holt
 
 
 
 
 
 
 
 
 
 
 
 
 
 
 
 
 51983 Hönig
 
 
 236 Honoria
 
 
 
 
 932 Hooveria
 
 
 
 
 1985 Hopmann
 
 
 
 
 
 
 
 
 
 23718 Horgos
 
 
 
 11409 Horkheimer
 3137 Horky
 805 Hormuthia
 
 11132 Horne
 
 
 
 
 
 
 
 
 
 
 
 
 
 
 1924 Horus
 
 
 
 
 
 
 
 
 
 
 
 
 
 
 
 
 
 
 
 
 
 
 
 
 
 
 
 
 
 
 3031 Houston
 
 
 
 
 
 
 9069 Hovland
 
 
 
 
 
 
 
 
 
 
 
 
 
 
 
 
 
 
 
 
 
 
 
 
 
 
 
 
 
 
 
 
 
 
 
 
 
 
 
 
 
 2069 Hubble
 
 
 
 260 Huberta
 
 
 
 
 
 
 
 
 
 
 
 
 379 Huenna
 
 
 
 
 
 
 
 
 
 
 
 
 
 
 
 
 
 
 
 
 
 
 
 
 
 
 
 
 
 
 3988 Huma
 
 
 
 
 
 
 
 
 
 
 
 
 
 
 
 
 434 Hungaria
 
 
 1452 Hunnia
 
 
 
 
 7225 Huntress
 
 
 
 
 
 3425 Hurukawa
 
 
 1840 Hus
 
 
 
 
 
 
 
 38628 Huya
 
 
 
 
 
 
 
 
 
 
 221628 Hyatt
 430 Hybris
 
 
 10 Hygiea
 
 
 10370 Hylonome
 1842 Hynek
 
 
 
 
 238 Hypatia
 1309 Hyperborea
 
 14827 Hypnos
 7352 Hypsenor
 587 Hypsipyle

See also 
 List of minor planet discoverers
 List of observatory codes

References 
 

Lists of minor planets by name